The APZ (Abnormal Mental States) questionnaire is one of the most widely used psychometric scales for assessing subjective experiences of altered states of consciousness. First published in 1998 by Adolf Dittrich, the APZ questionnaire comprises three dimensions: "Oceanic Boundlessness (OSE)", "Dread of Ego Dissolution (AIA)" and "Visionary Restructuralization (VUS)". According to Google Scholar, it has been cited at least 269 times.

Notes

Psychological tests and scales
Consciousness studies
Mental states
Hallucinations
Psychedelia